The Puerto Rico soccer league system is a series of professional and amateur soccer leagues based in Puerto Rico. Sometimes erroneously called the Puerto Rican soccer pyramid, teams and leagues in the United States are not linked by the system of promotion and relegation typical in soccer elsewhere. Instead, the Puerto Rican Football Federation (FPF) officially defines leagues in levels, called divisions, with the top two sanctioned directly by the FPF.

Men

In Puerto Rico, professional men's outdoor soccer leagues are ranked by the Puerto Rican Football Federation into one division: Division I. Amateur soccer organizations are also recognized by the FPF, but individual amateur leagues are not.

Professional
There are currently no recognized professional leagues. 

1The PRSL recessed on 2010, and established a new tournament called "Supercopa DirecTV 2010" which served as the qualifier for the 2011 CFU Club Championship.

2The PRSL folded in the 2012 season, leaving Liga Nacional to be the sole D1 league at the time.

3 The 2015 Puerto Rico Soccer League season did not take place, but teams then participated in the Excellence Cup

4 The 2016 Liga Nacional season did not take place, but teams then participated in the Copa Luis Villarejo

Amateur

The two amateur men's outdoor soccer leagues are the Puerto Rico Soccer League (PRSL) and the Liga Nacional de Fútbol de Puerto Rico (LNF).

Men's national soccer cups
 Copa Luis Villarejo — open to all FPF-sanctioned amateur and professional leagues

References